The 1990 Youngstown State Penguins football team was an American football team represented Youngstown State University as an independent during the 1990 NCAA Division I-AA football season. In their fifth season under head coach Jim Tressel, the team compiled an 11–1 record and lost to UCF in the first round of the NCAA Division I-AA playoffs. 

Wide receiver Ray Ellington received the team's most valuable player award. The team's statistical leaders included Ray Issac with 1,597 passing yards, Archie Herring with 904 rushing yards, Ray Ellington with 696 receiving yards, Jeff Wilkins with 86 points scored, and Derek Pixley with 96 tackles (including 60 solo tackles).

Schedule

References

Youngstown State
Youngstown State Penguins football seasons
Youngstown State Penguins football